Hairúya is an extinct Witotoan language that was spoken on the Tamboryaco River, a tributary of the Putumayo River, in southeastern Colombia.

Word list
A word list of Hairúya was collected by Czech explorer  from Hairúya speakers in São Paulo de Olivença. Vráz's list was subsequently published in Loukotka (1949):

{| class="wikitable sortable"
! French gloss (original) !! English gloss (translated) !! Hairúya
|-
| blanc, un || white man || rakuiča
|-
| bon || good || mareru
|-
| canard || duck || noko
|-
| caoutchouc || rubber || xiterai
|-
| chemin || path || ifoike
|-
| chute d’eau || waterfall || nofuiko
|-
| colline || hill || ikóñe
|-
| dent || tooth || atíɗo
|-
| homme || man || yiza
|-
| jaguar || jaguar || hituidé
|-
| jour || day || yuičai
|-
| lance || spear || óte
|-
| maïs || but || kobé
|-
| maison || house || hofo
|-
| massue || club || biɗevá
|-
| œuf || egg || hege
|-
| petit || small || učiyi
|-
| il va pleuvoir || it will rain || ɗeite
|-
| poisson || fish || refido
|-
| comment te portes-tu? || how are you? || nefo it’o
|-
| poule || hen || atahua
|-
| rame || oar || iforo
|-
| rouge || red || trioɗe
|-
| sel || salt || yá
|-
| serpent || snake || tokúɗo
|-
| tabac || tobacco || tó
|-
| tuer || kill || dutakai
|-
| urubû (Cathartes foetens) || black vulture || inó
|}

References

Languages of Colombia
Witotoan languages